The Norfolk State Spartans football team represents Norfolk State University in Division I FCS college football. The team plays their home games at William "Dick" Price Stadium in Norfolk, Virginia.

History

Classifications
1958–1972: NCAA College Division
1965–1969: NAIA
1970–1984: NAIA Division I
1973–1996: NCAA Division II
1997–present: NCAA Division I–AA/FCS

Conference memberships
1938–1952: Independent
1953–1960: Eastern Intercollegiate Conference
1961: Independent
1962–1996: Central Intercollegiate Athletic Association
1997–1998: NCAA Division I–AA independent
1999–present: Mid-Eastern Athletic Conference

Championships

Conference championships

Division championships

Bowl games
The Spartans have appeared in four bowl games, with a record of 0–3–1.

FCS Playoffs results
The Spartans have appeared in the FCS playoffs one time with an overall record of 0–1.

Division II Playoffs results
The Bears have appeared in the Division II playoffs one time with an overall record of 0–1.

Rivalries

Old Dominion
NSU and Old Dominion played for the first time on November 26, 2011 in the first round of the FCS playoffs which resulted in a 35–18 Spartan loss. Old Dominion and NSU announced a new deal for a home and away series in 2013 and 2015 to help fill out open game dates for ODU's transition to the FBS. ODU plays at Foreman Field; NSU at Dick Price Stadium.

Hampton

As of the 2017 season, Norfolk State has a 28–26–1 series lead over the Pirates of Hampton University, another historically black university in the Hampton Roads area.

Notes

References

External links
 

 
1938 establishments in Virginia
American football teams established in 1938